High Society is a reality show following the lives of Tinsley Mortimer, a Manhattan socialite, and her friends, which premiered on The CW on October 3, 2010.

It was originally scheduled to air every Wednesday at 9 pm after America's Next Top Model but due to low ratings the network decided to push it back half hour to air after Fly Girls.

Starring
Tinsley Mortimer, a famous New York City socialite. The series follows her through a widely publicized divorce from her husband Topper, the descendant of a Standard Oil president, and her dating a German prince whom her mother Dale does not approve.
Dabney Mercer, Tinsley's younger sister and shoulder to cry on. Dabney lives with Jules Kirby at the Empire hotel, until Kirby is evicted.
Paul Johnson Calderon, a fame-hungry socialite from the Upper West Side and admitted alcoholic who has already been through rehab several times and still drinks. He survives by repeatedly asking his mother for more money from his trust fund. He is the only male cast member of the series.
Alexandra Osipow, Tinsley's loyal friend. She is an attorney and married to a Wall Street man.
Jules Kirby, daughter of a successful lawyer, lives with Dabney at the Empire hotel before being evicted for her abusive behavior toward hotel staff.
Devorah Rose (Deborah Denise Trachtenberg), editor-in-chief at Social Life magazine,  and the series' main antagonist.
Dale Mercer, mother of Tinsley and Dabney, divorced and later widowed from her daughters' father, joins a dating club for older women during filming.
Prince Prince Casimir zu Sayn-Wittgenstein-Sayn, a German aristocrat, son of Alexander, Prince zu Sayn-Wittgenstein-Sayn, and Tinsley's boyfriend. Dale disapproves of his relationship with her daughter. He appears in a recurring capacity.

Episodes

Season 1
The first season of High Society consisted of 8 episodes. It premiered on March 10, 2010 and finished Season 1 on April 28, 2010. The series premiered on March 10, 2010 on The CW, with 1.26 million viewers. The second episode of High Society improved over its premiere 22% in women 18-34 (1.1/3) and 13% in women 18-49 (0.9/2).
The series averaged 0.8 million viewers.  It was the lowest-rated primetime series on an American broadcast network for the 2009-10 television season.

Season 2

A second season of High Society was rumored for a 2011 airdate. The second season would've been located in the Hamptons starring Tinsley Mortimer and a whole new cast. However, the show was officially cancelled on May 20, 2010.

References 

The CW original programming
2010 American television series debuts
2010 American television series endings
2010s American reality television series